Jason Cascio (born March 5, 1985) is a former American soccer player.

Career

Youth and College
Cascio grew up in Chandler, Arizona and attended Hamilton High School, where he was a three time All State soccer player. In addition to playing soccer, he was a member of Hamilton’s 2003 Arizona state football championship team. Cascio attended Seattle University, playing on the men’s soccer team from 2003 to 2006. His freshman season as Seattle won the Division II NCAA soccer championship.

Professional
In 2008, Cascio signed with the Seattle Sounders of the USL First Division. He appeared in 24 USL-1 games and scored 1 goal for the Sounders, until the team folded at the end of 2008 due to Seattle Sounders FC joining Major League Soccer.

Having been unable to secure a professional contract, Cascio signed with Seattle Wolves of the USL Premier Development League for the 2009 season.

References

External links
 Seattle Sounders player profile

1985 births
Living people
American soccer players
Seattle Redhawks men's soccer players
Seattle Sounders (1994–2008) players
Washington Crossfire players
Kitsap Pumas players
USL First Division players
USL League Two players
Sportspeople from Chandler, Arizona
Soccer players from Arizona
Association football defenders
Association football forwards
Sportspeople from Redmond, Washington
Soccer players from Washington (state)